Gancho Evtimov (born 2 December 1969) is a Bulgarian former footballer who played as a defender.

His career is mostly associated with Neftochimic, where he is considered a club legend. He has also served as manager of the team.

References

1969 births
Living people
Bulgarian footballers
Association football defenders
FC Hebar Pazardzhik players
Neftochimic Burgas players
FC Lokomotiv 1929 Sofia players
First Professional Football League (Bulgaria) players